This is a list of Men's Downhill races in FIS Alpine Ski World Cup from 1967 to 2017.

References
Official FIS World Cup Source Data Base

Men's downhill races